Light truck or light-duty truck is a US classification for vehicles with a gross vehicle weight up to  and a payload capacity up to 4,000 pounds (1,815 kg).

United States 
Light trucks includes vans, pickups, and sport utility vehicles.

Fuel efficiency 

The United States government uses light truck as a vehicle class in regulating fuel economy through the Corporate Average Fuel Economy (CAFE) standard. 
The class includes vans, minivans, sport utility vehicles, and pickups.
Light trucks have lower fuel economy standards than cars, under the premise that these vehicles are used for utilitarian purposes rather than personal transportation.

Since light trucks sold in the United States are increasingly being used for personal use, some have advocated applying higher fuel economy standards to light trucks not used for utilitarian purposes.

Tariffs 
Light truck manufacturing in the United States is protected by the Chicken Tax, a 25% tariff on imported light trucks.

See also 
 California Air Resources Board
 Commercial vehicle
 Emission standard

References

External links 
Regulatory Announcement on EPA changing definitions of the light and heavy-duty trucks

Commercial vehicles